Kyle Reimers (born 10 January 1989) is a former Australian rules footballer, who played with Essendon in the AFL. Debuting in 2007, Reimers was pick number 47 in the 2006 AFL Draft, having played with Peel Thunder in the WAFL. He played for Western Australia in the 2005 U-16 Championships and the 2006 U-18 Championships.

Wearing the guernsey number 37, Reimers was an exciting developing player from 2008 onwards, winning the club rising star award for that year on the back of a NAB AFL Rising Star Nomination in round 16 against Richmond. A cult favourite amongst Essendon supporters, due to his bright orange boots and aggressive style of play, Reimers' career highlight was kicking eight goals in Essendon's 139 point win over the Gold Coast Suns in Round 6 of 2011. Reimers was de-listed at the end of 2012 and turned down an offer to train with Carlton in 2013.

During the Essendon Football Club supplements saga Reimers claimed that the players were asked to sign waivers and were injected with supplements that were "pushing the boundaries".

Post-AFL career
Kyle Reimers played for Perth Football Club in the W.A.F.L. in Season 2013 and in February 2014 returned to Victoria and was signed by Aberfeldie Football Club in the Essendon District Football League.

Statistics
 Statistics are correct to end 2012 season.

|- style="background-color: #EAEAEA"
! scope="row" style="text-align:center" | 2007
|  || 37 || 3 || 1 || 1 || 15 || 9 || 24 || 11 || 4 || 0.3 || 0.3 || 5.0 || 3.0 || 8.0 || 3.7 || 1.3
|- 
! scope="row" style="text-align:center" | 2008
|  || 37 || 15 || 13 || 10 || 160 || 63 || 223 || 70 || 36 || 0.9 || 0.7 || 10.7 || 4.2 || 14.9 || 4.7 || 2.4
|- style="background-color: #EAEAEA" 
! scope="row" style="text-align:center" | 2009
|  || 37 || 9 || 9 || 8 || 89 || 51 || 140 || 34 || 25 || 1.0 || 0.9 || 9.9 || 5.7 || 15.6 || 3.8 || 2.8
|-
! scope="row" style="text-align:center" | 2010
|  || 37 || 13 || 13 || 9 || 129 || 77 || 206 || 55 || 34 || 1.0 || 0.7 || 9.9 || 5.9 || 15.8 || 4.2 || 2.6
|- style="background-color: #EAEAEA" 
! scope="row" style="text-align:center" | 2011
|  || 37 || 15 || 27 || 17 || 120|| 40 || 160 || 45 || 40 || 1.8 || 1.1 || 8.0 || 2.7 || 10.7 || 3.0 || 2.7
|-
! scope="row" style="text-align:center" | 2012
|  || 37 || 5 || 6 || 5 || 41 || 9 || 50 || 21 || 12 || 1.2 || 1.0 || 8.2 || 1.8 || 10.0 || 4.2 || 2.4
|- class="sortbottom"
! colspan=3| Career
! 60
! 69
! 50
! 554
! 249
! 803
! 236
! 151
! 1.2
! 0.8
! 9.2
! 4.2
! 13.4
! 3.9
! 2.5
|}

References

External links

1989 births
Living people
Australian rules footballers from Western Australia
Essendon Football Club players
Perth Football Club players
People from Bunbury, Western Australia
Bunbury Football Club players
Bendigo Football Club players